Ulysses Sherman Grant (February 14, 1867 – September 21, 1932) was an American geologist. He was the son of Lewis A. Grant and Mary Helen Pierce.

Biography
Ulysses Sherman Grant was born in Moline, Illinois on February 14, 1867. He graduated from the University of Minnesota with B.S. in 1888, and received a Ph.D. from Johns Hopkins University in 1893. He married Avis Winchell in 1891, and they had four children.

From 1893 to 1899, Grant was an Assistant State Geologist (at the Geological and Natural History Survey of Minnesota, co-authoring several of its yearly reports) at the University of Minnesota. He was also an Instructor in Geology (1897-1898), and one of the editors of journal The American Geologist, founded by his mentor Newton Winchell in 1888.

In 1899, he became professor of geology at Northwestern University. He soon became the chairman of the geology department, a position he held until his death.

In 1899, Professor Grant inspected the Brule, Wisconsin area for ancient copper deposits.

He died in Chicago on September 21, 1932.

Notes

1867 births
1932 deaths
People from Moline, Illinois
American geologists
University of Minnesota alumni
Northwestern University faculty